Ron Moss (13 June 1922 – 22 October 2004) was an Australian cricketer. He played three first-class matches for New South Wales in 1948/49.

See also
 List of New South Wales representative cricketers

References

External links
 

1922 births
2004 deaths
Australian cricketers
New South Wales cricketers
Cricketers from Sydney